is a 2003 Japanese animated film directed by Konosuke Uda and written by Yoshiyuki Suga. It is the fourth animated movie in the manga/anime series One Piece and the franchise's first full-length feature, released independently of any "Toei Anime Fair" event. It was released on March 3, 2003. Desperate for cash, the Straw Hat Pirates enter a secret race between pirate crews known as the Dead End Competition. There, they must battle against powerful people, including the bounty hunter who wants to kill Gasparde and a climactic battle with marine-turned-pirate Captain Gasparde.

Plot 
In a port town pub, the once again flat broke Straw Hats witness a suspicious exchange between a customer and the proprietor. Nami immediately senses money and endeavors to convince the host to give her whatever information he had given him. The other Straw Hats join in and soon he is persuaded. He shows them to a backdoor, behind which they find a long and winding tunnel. That tunnel leads to a large underground chamber, where a number of pirate crews have a gathering. The island they are on, turns out to be the starting point of an irregularly occurring, anything-goes sailing competition. For a moment, the Straw Hats weigh whether it is wise to join in the race, considering that two giants and a crew of fish-men, who were once the rivals of Arlong's gang, were participating as well. But once they learn the height of the price money, not entering is out of the question. From the bookmaker they receive an eternal pose, to lead them to the goal of the race. Free food is available at the bottom of the chamber and Luffy makes extensive use of it. Gasparde is a deserted naval officer, with a bounty more than three times as high as Luffy's and said to be the race's favorite. A fight arises, and after Luffy and Shuraiya beat up his men.

They find themselves standing before the general himself. He is impressed with their skill and offers both of them to work under him. Of course they refuse, but Luffy finds some insulting words to do it and is caught off guard by Gasparde's right-hand man, Needles. Luffy's courage impresses Gasparde even more. He renews his offer, orders Needles to let go of the rookie pirate, and leaves the room. The next morning, a strong ocean current starts the race, by pushing the ships upstream over the island. As soon as they are over the top, the various crews start shooting broadsides, board each other's ships, and ram their competitors out of the water. But once the island is left behind, the field quickly clears up, leaving the Straw Hats time to eat. While inspecting the ship, Zoro discovers a boy named , who had stowed away to earn money by killing some pirate to buy medicine for his adoptive grandfather, who works as an engineer on Gasparde's partially steam powered ship. The race continues. After fighting yet another rival crew and an encounter with a group of large sea kings, they arrive at the island the eternal pose is pointing to. The eternal poses were all mislabeled and led the fleet of unsuspecting pirates into reach of the cannons of the navy stronghold Navarone. Luffy has no doubt to whose fault it is. They turn around and using Chopper's fine nose, attempt to catch up with Gasparde's ship. Shuraiya, who had followed Gasparde's invitation to come along on his ship, turns against him to take revenge for Gasparde's killing his parents and sister. He fights Needles and throws him over board, but stands no chance against Gasparde's Logia-type powers, which allow him to turn parts or all of his body into liquid or solid candy. The general is about to kill the bounty hunter, when the Straw Hats arrive and catch his attention. Luffy confronts him and the two engage in a fierce but one-sided battle. Any attack Luffy throws at his opponent causes his limbs to get stuck in Gasparde's body. Only after Sanji gives two sacks of flour to Luffy, can he overcome the villain's ability. Anaguma turns out to be a girl and Shuraiya's thought-dead sister, . With all their competitors taken out, the Straw Hats are about to arrive at the goal of the race, when a fleet of navy ships appears and forces them to abandon their prize money.

Cast

Music

Film comic

Shueisha created a film comic adaptation of the film, titled  and released it in two volumes on October 3, 2003 ( and ).

First volume chapter list

Second volume chapter list

Notes

References

External links
 Official website of Toei Animation 
 
 One Piece The Movie: Deddo Endo no Bōken at the Japanese Movie Database 

2003 anime films
Dead End no Bōken
Toei Animation films
Films scored by Kohei Tanaka
Films scored by Shirō Hamaguchi
Films about competitions

ru:Список анимационных фильмов о One Piece#Фильм четвёртый